"Suck It and See" is the third single from Arctic Monkeys' fourth studio album Suck It and See released via MP3 digital download and 7" vinyl on 31 October 2011 with the song "Evil Twin" appearing as a B-side. It is one of the rare incidences that a B-side for a single has charted higher than the single itself on release due to downloads, with "Suck It and See" reaching number 149 and "Evil Twin" reaching number 114 on the UK Singles Chart.

Music video
The music video for the single premiered on 16 September 2011 and for "Evil Twin" premiered on 27 October 2011 on YouTube. The video was directed by Focus Creeps. Videos were released for both songs.

The video for "Suck It and See" tells a narrative story of a biker (drummer Matt Helders) and his relationship with a lover, portrayed by American model Breana McDow. The video is set in California and mocks the macho nature of American biker culture. It has also been suggested that the video is a tongue-in-cheek response to criticism that the band's sound has become too "Americanised". Alex Turner briefly appears in a cameo. The biker's storyline is continued in the "Black Treacle", and "Evil Twin".

Track listing

Personnel
Alex Turner – lead vocals, rhythm and lead guitar
Jamie Cook – lead and rhythm guitar
Nick O'Malley – bass guitar, backing vocals
Matt Helders – drums, percussion, backing vocals

Charts

References

2011 singles
2011 songs
Arctic Monkeys songs
Domino Recording Company singles
Songs written by Alex Turner (musician)
Song recordings produced by James Ford (musician)